Forgotten continent may refer to:

Hypothetical continents

 Atlantis, mythical ancient submerged continent.
 Kumari Kandam
 Lemuria, hypothetical continent in the Indian Ocean.
 Meropis
 Mu, often called the lost continent.
 Terra Australis, mystical southern land, now confirmed as Antarctica.

Submerged continents

 Kerguelen Plateau, prehistoric continent, almost entirely submerged except for the Desolation Islands.
 Zealandia, prehistoric continent, almost entirely submerged except for the islands of New Zealand, New Caledonia, and some Australian islands.

Geological supercontinents
 Columbia
 Gondwana
 Kenorland
 Laurasia
 Nena
 Pangaea
 Pannotia
 Rodinia
 Ur
 Vaalbara

Other Prehistoric continents

 Arctica
 Asiamerica
 Atlantica
 Avalonia
 Baltica
 Cimmeria
 Congo craton
 Euramerica
 Kalaharia
 Kazakhstania
 Laurentia
 North China
 Siberia
 South China
 East Antarctica
 India

Use today

 Antarctica, the unsettled continent.
 Africa, the undeveloped continent.
 South America, along with Central America, is often overlooked by Western powers.

See also
Lost lands